Contacyphon americanus is a species of marsh beetle in the family Scirtidae.  It is found in North America.

References

Further reading

 
 
 

Scirtoidea